The Religious Worship Act 1718 (5 Geo. I, c. 4) was an Act of the Parliament of Great Britain. It repealed the Schism Act 1714.

Notes

History of Christianity in the United Kingdom
Great Britain Acts of Parliament 1718
1718 in Christianity
Law about religion in the United Kingdom